Los Angeles Museum may refer to:
 Natural History Museum of Los Angeles County, established 1913
 Los Angeles County Museum of Art, forked from the previous in 1961